O'Farrell is an anglicised form of the Old Irish patronym Ó Fearghail.

People with the surname

 Barry O'Farrell, Australian politician
 Bernadette O'Farrell (1924–1999), Irish actress
 Bob O'Farrell, American baseballer
 Brett O'Farrell (disambiguation), several people
 Brett O'Farrell (Australian rules footballer) (born 1978), Australian footballer
 Brett O'Farrell (rugby league) (born 1980), Australian footballer
Broderick O'Farrell
 Derek O'Farrell (born 1983), Canadian rower
 Elizabeth O'Farrell (1884–1957), Irish revolutionary
 Emer O'Farrell (born 1981), Irish athlete
 Finola O'Farrell, British judge
 Francis Fergus O'Farrell, Irish soldier
 Frank O'Farrell, Irish footballer
 Henry O'Farrell, Australian assassin
 Jasper O'Farrell, American politician
 John O'Farrell (disambiguation), several people
John O'Farrell (author) (born 1962), British writer and political activist
John O'Farrell (politician) (1826–1892), Canadian politician
John O'Farrell (venture capitalist), American financier
John A. O'Farrell (1823–1900), American adventurer
J. T. O'Farrell (died 1971), Irish politician 
 Josh O'Farrell, American politician
 Lauren O'Farrell (born 1977), British artist
 Luke O'Farrell (born 1990), Irish hurler
 Maggie O'Farrell, British novelist
 Maud O'Farrell Swartz (1879–1937), American politician
 Maureen O'Farrell, British actress
 Michael O'Farrell (disambiguation), several people
 Michael O'Farrell (bishop) (1865–1928), Australian bishop
 Michael O'Farrell (gangster) (1949–1989), American gangster
 Michael J. O'Farrell (1832–1894), Irish bishop
 Mitch O'Farrell, American politician
 Patrick O'Farrell, Australian historian
 Patrick H. O'Farrell, American biologist
 Pierre O’Farrell, American actor 
 Richard O'Farrell (British Army officer) (died 1757), British colonel
 Richard O'Farrell (Irish Confederate), Irish soldier
 Séamus O'Farrell (died 1973), Irish politician
 Seánie O'Farrell (born 1977), Irish hurler
 Tadeo O'Farrell (died 1602), Irish bishop
 Talbot O'Farrell (18781952), English singer
 Tony O'Farrell (born 1947), Irish mathematician
 Ursula O'Farrell (née Cussen; born 1934), Irish author

Places with the name

 O'Farrell, Texas
 O'Farrell Community School
 Mitchell Brothers O'Farrell Theatre

See also
Ó Fearghail
Farrell (disambiguation)

English-language surnames
Surnames of Irish origin
Anglicised Irish-language surnames